Tomato sauce (also known as salsa roja in Spanish or salsa di pomodoro in Italian) can refer to many different sauces made primarily from tomatoes, usually to be served as part of a dish, rather than as a condiment. Tomato sauces are common for meat and vegetables, but they are perhaps best known as bases for sauces for Mexican salsas and Italian pasta dishes. Tomatoes have a rich flavor, high water content, soft flesh which breaks down easily, and the right composition to thicken into a sauce when stewed without the need of thickeners such as roux or masa. All of these qualities make them ideal for simple and appealing sauces.

In countries such as the United Kingdom, India, Australia, New Zealand, and South Africa, the term tomato sauce is used to describe a condiment similar to what Americans call tomato ketchup. In some of these countries, both terms are used for the condiment.

History

Tomato sauces, along with similarly related and prepared tomatillo sauces, are presumed to have been in use since antiquity by the peoples of Central and South America as bases for many dishes. However, much of Pre-Columbian cuisine history in Mexico, along with other culturally significant information, had been purged during the periods of conquest by Europeans, chiefly the Spanish.

Bernardino de Sahagún, a Franciscan friar from the Kingdom of Spain, is believed to be the first European to write about tomato sauce after encountering it for sale in the markets of Tenochtitlan (Mexico City, today). The first Italian cookbook to include tomato sauce, Lo Scalco alla Moderna ('The Modern Steward'), was written by Italian chef Antonio Latini and was published in two volumes in 1692 and 1694. The use of tomato sauce with pasta appeared for the first time in 1790 in the Italian cookbook L'Apicio moderno, by Roman chef Francesco Leonardi.

Description 

A simple mediterranean style tomato sauce consists of chopped tomatoes sautéed in olive oil and simmered until they lose their raw flavor, seasoned to taste with salt, or other herbs or spices. Optionally, tomato skins may be scalded and peeled according to texture (especially thicker pelati paste varieties) and tomato seeds may be removed for aesthetic purposes, leaving just the tomato flesh and pulp.

Depending on how it is cooked, tomato sauce may be thinner than the tomato purée or tomato paste it may be made from. It may serve as an ingredient in other dishes, like spaghetti and meatballs or tomato soup.

Water or a more flavorful liquid such as stock or wine is sometimes added to keep the sauce from becoming too thick while simmering. Onion and garlic are typically sweated or sautéed before the tomatoes are added, or puréed together with tomatoes and then cooked together. Other seasonings typically include dried red chili flakes, epazote, basil, oregano, parsley, and black pepper. Ground or chopped meat is also common.

Varieties

Mexican

Tomato sauce was an ancient condiment in Mesoamerican food. The first person to write about what may have been a tomato sauce was Bernardino de Sahagún, a Franciscan friar from the Kingdom of Spain who later moved to New Spain, made note of a prepared sauce that was offered for sale in the markets of Tenochtitlan (Mexico City today). Of this he wrote (translated from Spanish),  Spaniards later brought the use of tomatoes to Europe.

Basic Mexican tomato sauce (salsa de tomate rojo o jitomate) was traditionally prepared with a molcajete to puree the tomatoes. Food that is cooked in tomato sauce is known as entomatada. Tomato sauce is used as a base for spicy sauces and moles.

Italian

The misconception that the tomato has been central to Italian cuisine since its introduction from the Americas is often repeated. Though the tomato was introduced from the Spanish New World to European botanists in the 16th century, tomato sauce made a relatively late entry in Italian cuisine: in Antonio Latini's cookbook Lo scalco alla moderna (Naples, 1692).

Latini was chef to the Spanish viceroy of Naples, and one of his tomato recipes is for sauce alla spagnuola, "in the Spanish style". The first known use of tomato sauce with pasta appears in the Italian cookbook L'Apicio moderno, by Roman chef Francesco Leonardi, edited in 1790.

Italian varieties of tomato sauce range from the very simple pasta al pomodoro to the piquant puttanesca and arrabbiata sauces. Tomato sauce with pasta can stand on its own or it can also be paired with ingredients such as sausage, clams, pancetta cubes, tuna or vegetables, for a more lively pasta dish.

Tomato-garlic sauce is prepared using tomatoes as a main ingredient, and is used in various cuisines and dishes. In Italian cuisine, alla pizzaiola refers to tomato-garlic sauce, which is used on pizza, pasta and meats.

French 
 is one of the five mother sauces of classical French cooking, as codified by Auguste Escoffier in the early 20th century. It consists of salt belly of pork, onions, bay leaves, thyme, tomato purée or fresh tomatoes, roux, garlic, salt, sugar, and pepper.

New Zealand and South Africa 
The most common use of the term tomato sauce in New Zealand and South Africa is to describe a popular, commercially produced condiment that is a type of table sauce, similar to American ketchup but without vinegar, which is typically applied to foods such as meat pies, sausages, other cooked meat (in particular steak), and fish and chips.  Tomato-based sauces served with pasta would commonly be referred to as "pasta sauce" or "Napoletana sauce".

United Kingdom 
The meaning of the term "tomato sauce" depends on the context; on a restaurant menu the phrase "in a tomato sauce" means a freshly prepared tomato-based sauce as used on pasta, and colloquially it may refer to either the pasta sauce, or tomato ketchup.

Australia 

In Australia "tomato sauce" generally refers to the same style of table sauce as American ketchup but varies in mixture and does not contain onions. Some sources say that Australian tomato sauce has less tomato than ketchup, but this varies between brands and is not a universal feature. Australian tomato sauce is used in the same way as American ketchup.

The sauces used in preparing meals such as pasta, or stews are usually called Pasta sauce or if in the context of cooking, tomato sauce.

United States

In the U.S. tomato sauce is typically sold jarred or canned, with minimal ingredients, and is not normally used as is. Related ingredients are tomato purée and tomato paste, each of which is similar but paste has a thicker consistency.  Tomato purée and tomato paste have FDA standards of identity (since 1939) for percentage of tomato solids, and historically did not contain seasonings other than salt; in recent decades variants with basil or other traditional Italian seasonings became common.  Tomato sauce is non-standardized.

Louisiana
A spicy tomato sauce known as sauce piquante is common in Louisiana Cajun cuisine, that can contain any seafood, poultry, or meats such as wild game. It is typically served over white rice. In Louisiana Creole cuisine, there is a tomato sauce known as a Creole sauce. It is similar to Italian tomato sauce, but features more Louisiana flavors derived from the fusion of French and Spanish cooking styles. They both usually contain the traditional holy trinity of diced bell pepper, onion, and celery.

Tomato gravy
Tomato gravy is distinct from the term as used by Italian Americans when referring to a type of tomato sauce particularly where tomatoes were a staple food. The cooked tomatoes, some fat (usually cured pork fat) and flour are cooked together until thick, and seasoned with salt and pepper. Onions or bell peppers may be added as well. Typically, tomato gravy is served over pasta.

Indian
Some Indian curries have a tomato-based sauce, notably many vegetarian style dishes.

See also

 Hot sauce
 Neapolitan sauce
 List of tomato dishes
 Tomate frito

References

External links

 The Cook's Decameron: A Study In Taste, Containing Over Two Hundred Recipes For Italian Dishes from Project Gutenberg. This is from a very old source, and reflects the cooking at the turn of the 20th century.
 Classic, authentic Italian "Sunday Gravy"

Italian sauces
Mother sauces
Tomato products
Tomato sauces